2000 hurricane season may refer to: 

2000 Atlantic hurricane season
2000 Pacific hurricane season